The Firozpur Cantonment–Shri Ganganagar Express is an Express train belonging to Northern Railway zone that runs between  and Hanumangarh Junction in India. Earlier it was used to run between Firozpur Cantonment and Shri Ganganagar Junction.I t is currently being operated with 14601/14602 train numbers on a weekly basis.

Service

The 14601/Firozpur Cantt–Shri Ganganagar Express has an average speed of 44 km/hr and covers 189 km in 4h 10m. The 14602/Shri Ganganagar–Firozpur Cantt Express has an average speed of 42 km/hr and covers 189 km in 4h 25m.

Route and halts 

The important halts of the train are:

 
 
 
 
 
 
 
 
 
 
Sadulshahr
Hanumangarh Junction

Coach composition

The train has standard ICF rakes with max speed of 110 kmph. The train consists of 16 coaches:

 14 General Unreserved
 2 Seating cum Luggage Rake

Traction

Both trains are hauled by a Ludhiana Loco Shed-based WDM-3A diesel locomotive from Firozpur to Hanumangarh and vice versa.

Rake sharing

The train shares its rake with 14629/14630 Sutlej Express and 54641/54642 Delhi–Firozpur Passenger.

See also 

 Firozpur Cantonment railway station
 Shri Ganganagar Junction railway station
 Sutlej Express
 Delhi–Firozpur Passenger

Notes

References

External links 

 14601/Firozpur Cantt - Shri Ganganagar Express
 14602/Shri Ganganagar - Firozpur Cantt Express

Transport in Firozpur
Transport in Sri Ganganagar
Express trains in India
Rail transport in Punjab, India
Rail transport in Rajasthan
Railway services introduced in 2012